Roger W. Moss (born January 31, 1940) is an historian, educator, administrator and author in Philadelphia, Pennsylvania. Throughout a long career he has also been an aggressive and entrepreneurial advocate for the preservation and authentic restoration of historic buildings.  For forty years Moss directed the Athenaeum of Philadelphia, a special collections library near Independence Hall, and for 25 of those years he also taught in the Graduate Program in Historic Preservation at the University of Pennsylvania.

Early years

Roger William Moss was born and raised in Zanesville, Ohio, the only child of Roger William and Dorothy Elizabeth Martin Moss.  He received his B.S.Ed and M.A. degrees from Ohio University.  During the summer of 1962 he was an assistant to the director of the Peace Corps staff preparing the first team destined for the Cameroon.  While pursuing his Master of Arts degree he was curator of rare books at Ohio University Library which resulted in his first publications.  In 1964 Moss accepted a teaching fellowship from The University of Delaware leading to his Ph.D. with a major in early American history and a minor in American Material Culture at Winterthur Museum.  During the summer of 1966 he studied English country houses and collections as an Attingham Trust Fellow. and during the academic year 1967-68 he was an adjunct lecturer in history for the University of Delaware and the University of Maryland extension programs.

Move to Philadelphia

In 1968 Moss became the Executive Director of The Athenæum of Philadelphia, a member-supported library founded in 1814 and housed in a National Historic Landmark building near Independence Hall.  During his four-decade tenure there he restored and expanded the building and reorganized the nearly moribund institution as an independent research library specializing in American architecture prior to 1930 and nineteenth-century material culture. Under his direction the research collections in architecture and Victorian-era design rapidly expanded, including the acquisition of the archives of numerous major American architects ranging from Thomas Ustick Walter (1804-1887) to Paul Philippe Cret (1876-1945). In 1969 Moss became a trustee of the Christopher Ludwick Foundation, one of Philadelphia's oldest philanthropic institutions founded in 1799 to advance the education of the poor children of Philadelphia.  He would serve the foundation as an officer or trustee for forty-six years.

When The Victorian Society in America was founded in 1966, Moss became an early board member and officer.  He also capitalized on the explosion of popular interest in Victorian architecture and design in the 1970s and 1980s.  One of his first steps was to invite the Victorian Society to establish its national office at the Athenæum which provided a base for the infant society and both national and international visibility for the Athenæum. Moss also proved to be an aggressive collector with remarkable fund raising ability, particularly for the acquisition, conservation, proper housing, and exhibition of architectural records, securing major grants from national, state, and local foundations for those purposes.  He also doubled the membership and raised substantial sums to endow the building, staff positions, and programs.  In 1976 Moss launched a publication series to reprint rare Victorian design sources from the Athenæum collection, beginning with Exterior Decoration: A Treatise on the Artistic Use of Colors in the Ornamentation of Buildings originally published in 1885 by the Devoe Paint Company www.1754Paint.com complete with large color plates and authentic paint samples.  This reprint became a seminal influence in the nationwide movement to preserve, restore, and authentically repaint Victorian-era buildings.  In 1973 Moss was elected a Fellow of the Royal Society for the Encouragement of Arts, Manufactures and Commerce, London, England.

Moss has been well known in historic preservation in the U.S. for several decades. He has taught at the University of Pennsylvania in the historic preservation program since 1981.  His works at the Athenaeum of Philadelphia since 1968 include restoration of the institution's building, and amassing a significant collection of historic architectural drawings and photographs for its library. He has written numerous books and articles.

One of his most influential contributions to preservationists and architects working in the field may be his landmark books on historic American paints and colors.  His investigations led to the creation of the first full line of historic paint colors produced by Sherwin-Williams Paints, the American paint manufacturer.

References

Moss, Roger W. (1981)  Century of Color: Exterior Decoration for American Buildings, 1820-1920, American Life Foundation 
Tatman, Sandra L., and Roger W. Moss (1985)  Biographical Dictionary of Philadelphia Architects, 1700-1930, G.K. Hall & Co. 
Moss, Roger W. (1990)  The American Country House, Henry Holt & Co. 
Moss, Roger W. (Ed.) (1994)  Paint in America: The Color of Historic Buildings, National Trust for Historic Preservation 
Moss, Roger W. (1998)  Historic Houses of Philadelphia: A Tour of the Region's Museum Homes University of Pennsylvania Press 
Moss, Roger W. (2004)  Historic Sacred Places Of Philadelphia, University of Pennsylvania Press

External links
Roger Moss official website (Winkler & Moss)

1940 births
Living people
Writers from Philadelphia
People from Zanesville, Ohio
American architectural historians
American male non-fiction writers
Historical preservationists
Educators from Philadelphia
Historians from Pennsylvania
Historians from Ohio